Extra, Vol. 1 is a rarities double album by KMFDM. It was released on June 3, 2008. It is the first of a three volume, double-disc set collection of tracks that were not included in any of the ten KMFDM Classic albums.

Track listing

Disc one

Disc two

References

External links
Extra, Vol. 1 at the official KMFDM website
Extra, Vol. 1 at Metropolis Records

KMFDM compilation albums
2008 compilation albums
Metropolis Records compilation albums